DecembeRadio is the eponymous major label debut album by the band DecembeRadio. Produced by Scotty Wilbanks, the album features a guitar-driven sound that quickly earned it comparisons to The Black Crowes, King's X, Aerosmith and Free. The album was nominated for a "Best Rock or Rap Gospel Album" Grammy Award, and won the 2007 Dove Award for "Rock Album of the Year".  Two of the album's tracks were also nominated for Dove Awards: "Drifter" for "Song of the Year", and "Dangerous" for "Rock Recorded Song of the Year".

Overview
DecembeRadio was recorded at Southern Tracks Recording in Atlanta, Georgia from January 26 to February 1, 2006.  Whereas the band's previous album of original material, Dangerous, contained many mid-tempo songs and ballads with prominent acoustic guitar, most of the songs on DecembeRadio are propelled by overdriven chords played in unison by the two guitarists.  Verses often give way to sections of jangly ("Table" and "Can’t Hide") or ringing ("Greed") guitars punctuated by crunchy power chords.  First single "Love Found Me (Love’s Got a Hold)" is the only obvious example of the band's Southern rock influences, sounding particularly like The Black Crowes with its underlying piano, horns and female backing vocals.  Acoustic guitars feature prominently in the ballad "Drifter", and also appear in the mid-tempo "Least of These" and "Alright My Friend".  Producer Scotty Wilbanks adds color not only with subtle sound and vocal effects, but with his own keyboard playing (which takes center stage in the untitled studio jam after "Least of These").

Lyrical topics are varied, and include reminders that all will face God eventually ("Can’t Hide" and "Table"), exhortations to follow Biblical example ("Dangerous" and "Least of These") and acknowledgments of personal struggles ("Greed" and "Razor").

Three of the songs on DecembeRadio are rewrites of songs that appeared on Dangerous.  "Love Found Me (Love’s Got a Hold)" features completely rewritten verses.  "Live and Breathe" offers rewritten verses, new lyrics and a new melody in the chorus.  Most radically changed, however, was "Dangerous", which retains only the main riff and the first line of the chorus.

Release
DecembeRadio was released in the US through Slanted Records on June 27, 2006.  The album appeared in two of Billboards Christian music charts during its first week of eligibility,  and then dropped out of the charts for over a year.  It was during DecembeRadio's 2008 tour with Third Day that the album returned to the charts, including its first Billboard Top Heatseekers appearance, where it reached the antepenultimate spot.  DecembeRadio has sold nearly 50,000 copies.

Expanded Edition
An Expanded Edition''' of DecembeRadio'' was released on November 13, 2007.  This version includes the original album (minus the studio jam after "Least of These"), and adds a new single called "Find You Waiting" (written by DecembeRadio & Scotty Wilbanks), as well as an acoustic version of "Love Found Me (Love's Got a Hold)".  "Find You Waiting" was recorded during the September 2007 sessions for the band's next album.  The Expanded Edition is also an Enhanced CD, containing video of a live performance of "Drifter" and a twenty-four-minute interview.  New artwork and a sticker complete the package.

Track listing
All songs written by Brian Bunn, Eric Miker, Josh Reedy and Scotty Wilbanks, except where noted.

 "Can't Hide" – 3:25
 "Dangerous" – 4:07
 "Love Found Me (Love's Got a Hold)" – 3:38
 "Greed" – 4:26
 "Drifter" (Bunn, Miker, Reedy) – 4:39
 "Live and Breathe" – 3:37
 "Alright My Friend" – 4:30
 "Razor" – 4:00
 "Table" – 4:12
 "Least of These" – 4:33
There is a hidden studio jam (2:54) that begins at 5:01, bringing the track length to 7:55.

Personnel
 Brian Bunn – lead guitar and vocals
 Boone Daughdrill – drums
 Eric Miker – guitar and vocals
 Josh Reedy – bass guitar and lead vocals

Additional personnel
 Scotty Wilbanks – piano, B3, keyboards and percussion
 Sam Skelton – saxophone on "Love Found Me (Love's Got a Hold)"
 Eric Alexander – trombone on "Love Found Me (Love's Got a Hold)"
 Mike Barry – trumpet on "Love Found Me (Love's Got a Hold)"
 Tann Smith, Keesha Dement and Cheryl Rogers – background vocals on "Love Found Me (Love's Got a Hold)" and "Drifter"
 Peter Stroud – slide guitar on "Drifter"

Charts

Album

Singles

Awards 
In 2007, the album won a Dove Award for Rock Album of the Year at the 38th GMA Dove Awards.

Notes

References

External links
DecembeRadio e-card

DecembeRadio albums
2006 albums